Dease Lake is a lake in the Stikine Plateau of the Northern Interior of British Columbia, Canada, located at the head of the Dease River, which flows north then northeast from the lake to join the Liard River.  The community of Dease Lake, British Columbia, formerly Dease Lake Post, is located at the south end of the lake, straddling a low pass which leads into the basin from the Tanzilla River, a tributary of the Stikine.  The area around the lake was the focus of the Cassiar Gold Rush and numerous ghost towns and former settlement sites are scattered around its shores, including Laketon and Centre City. Dease Lake is the burial site and has a monument to English travelogue writer Warburton Pike.

Name origin
The lake was named in 1834 by John McLeod, a Chief Trader for the Hudson's Bay Company at the former Dease Lake Post, for Peter Warren Dease, superintendent of the New Caledonia Fur District from 1830 to 1834, who had served with the Franklin Expedition of 1825-27 and later was senior officer of the Dease & Simpson Arctic Expedition in 1837–39.

References

Cassiar Country
Lakes of British Columbia
Stikine Plateau